The Intervision Song Contest 2008 was the 5th Intervision Song Contest. The contest took place at Festivalny concert hall in the Russian city of Sochi. Eligible countries that may compete in the contest are from the Commonwealth of Independent States, the Shanghai Cooperation Organisation and former Soviet Republics.

Eleven countries confirmed their participation in the contest.

Location 

The 2008 contest took place in the coastal city of Sochi.

Confirmed participants

Night 1 – Original Song

The first night saw the 11 participants performing an original song sung either in Russian or their national language. The running order was as follows:

Night 2 – Retro Hit

The second night saw the 11 participants perform hits from the 20th Century and were performed in Russian. The running order was as follows:

Night 3 – World Hit

The third competitive night of the contest saw the participants performing world hits in the original language of the song. These songs were to be the most suitable for your image.  The running order was as follows:

Night 4 – Gala Night

On the Gala Night performers from across the competing nations performed on stage with their hits, performers included Philip Kirkov, Irina Allegrova and others. The night culminated in the announcement of the results.

This meant the final scoreboard results were:

Other awards

Also there were other awards presented for different countries such as:

Other countries

The contest is open to members of the Commonwealth of Independent States, the Shanghai Co-operation Organisation and other Central Asian countries.

  – Georgia was meant to debut at the 2008 contest but withdrew in June 2008 due to the Russo-Georgian War earlier that year. Despite this the organizing committee stated that they would welcome Georgia’s participation. If Georgia went on to participate they would have been represented by Salome Korkotashvili.
  – Uzbekistan was meant to debut at the 2008 contest but withdrew a couple of days before the contest for unknown reasons. They were really slow at selecting their participant but a week before the contest they selected Shakhnoza Usmanhodzhaeva who would have represented  them under the stage name of “Anor”. But later it was announced that they would not compete.

References

2008 song contests
2008 in radio
2008 in Russian television
2008
Events in Sochi